Pobre Rico (International Title: The Switch) is a 2012 Chilean telenovela produced and broadcast by TVN.

Plot 
Freddy Perez (Simón Pesutic) and Nicolas Cotapos (Alonso Quintero) lead a normal life until now. The two boys are happy and comfortable in each of their worlds. While Freddy lives with his mother Eloisa (Carolina Arregui) and sister Megan (Teresita Commentz) in scarce economic conditions in Cerro Navia, Santiago, Nicolas is torn between the wealth and glamor of belonging to one of the richest and most powerful families in Chile. But one day they experience a radical change and face the news that will mark their lives: 17 years ago the babies of both families were switched at birth in a cold southern hospital.

When the families discover this error, it quickly becomes national news because of the fame of the powerful Cotapos family. The decision of what to do is settled in court. A court decision forces both teenagers to live for a year with their biological families. When they turn 18 they may decide for themselves who they would like to live with.

Cast 
 Simón Pesutic - Freddy Pérez
 Alonso Quintero - Nicolás Cotapos
 Carolina Arregui - Eloísa Rivas, Freddy's mother and Juan Carlos's ex-wife
 Francisco Reyes - Maximo Cotapos, Virginia's husband
 Amparo Noguera - Virginia Donoso, Maximo's wife
 Mauricio Pesutic - Juan Carlos Pérez, Eloisa's ex-husband
 Susana Hidalgo - Julieta Cotapos, Maximo and Virginia's elder daughter
 Álvaro Espinoza - Luis Felipe Tagle, Julieta's boyfriend
 Katyna Huberman - Rosa Lagos, Claudia's mother and Eloisa's best friend
 Gabriela Hernández - Sonia Hundurraga, Cotapos's maid
 Roberto Prieto - César Parra, Rosa's boyfriend and Juan Carlos's best friend
 Magdalena Müller - Claudia Lagos, Freddy's girlfriend and Rosa's daughter
 Valentina Carvajal - Martina Guzmán, Nicolás's girlfriend
 Francisco Puelles - Rodrigo Parra, César's son and Freddy's best friend
 Teresita Commentz - Megan Pérez, Eloisa and Juan Carlos's younger daughter

Supporting cast
 Otilio Castro - Óscar "Cachito" Muñoz, Maximo's half-brother
 Elvis Fuentes - Ramiro, Cotapos's chauffeur
 Silvia Santelices - Sara Garcia-Huidobro
 María Paz Grandjean - The Mexican, boxer
 César Caillet - Álex Garrido
 Bárbara Lama - Sandrita, secretary
 Otilio Castro - Óscar "Cachito" Muñoz, brother Maximo's
 Nicolás Poblete - Cristián Bascuñan
 Ariel Mateluna - Jorge Galdames Jr.
 Karla Melo - Denisse Lagos
 Jaime Omeñaca - Jorge "Anaconda" Galdames
 Marcelo Valdivieso - Professor Queirolo
 Sebastián Goya - Mario Williams
 Andrea Zuckermann - Zasha
 Natalie Dujovne - Pamela Matamala
 Teresa Hales - Daniela Tepu
 Marina Salcedo - Kimberly Suason

References

External links
  Official website
 

2012 telenovelas
Chilean telenovelas
2012 Chilean television series debuts
2013 Chilean television series endings
Spanish-language telenovelas
Televisión Nacional de Chile telenovelas